Sauli Pälli (23 September 1912 – 13 December 1960) was a Finnish ski jumper. He competed in the individual event at the 1936 Winter Olympics.

References

External links
 

1912 births
1960 deaths
Finnish male ski jumpers
Olympic ski jumpers of Finland
Ski jumpers at the 1936 Winter Olympics
People from Kotka
Sportspeople from Kymenlaakso
20th-century Finnish people